A Prince There Was is a lost 1921 American silent drama film directed by Tom Forman and written by Waldemar Young based upon the novel Enchanted Hearts by Darragh Aldrich and the play by George M. Cohan. The film stars Thomas Meighan, Mildred Harris, Charlotte Jackson, Nigel Barrie, Guy Oliver, Arthur Stuart Hull, and Sylvia Ashton. The film was released on November 13, 1921, by Paramount Pictures.

Plot
As described in a film magazine, wealthy Charles Edward Martin (Meighan) has been leading a shiftless, luxurious life and takes no interest in himself or others until a little boarding house drudge (Jackson), who sleeps under the stairs there and where she can hear the comings and goings of the residents, calls on him to seek his aid for a struggling young woman novelist, Katherine Woods (Harris), who lives there. The young millionaire had previously been urged to take the position as assistant editor of a popular magazine, but had declined, preferring a sodden life. The earnestness of the girl interests him and, more as an exploit than an ambition, he undertakes playing "fairy prince" to the novelist. He moves into the boarding house, where there are several humorous character sketches, and almost immediately falls in love with Katherine. He assumes the name Prince, and the novelist does not recognize him as the man whose money drove her father into financial ruin and suicide. She gives "Prince" the manuscript of a novel which he buys immediately. Charles then hastens to his magazine publisher friend Jack Carruthers (Barrie) to get it printed. Jack tells him that the magazine had already seen it and declined to publish the novel. Remembering the hope in Katherine's eyes when he pretended to buy the novel, Charles purchases the entire magazine publishing establishment, much to the consternation of his broker, J.J. Stratton (Hull). It turns out that the rather unscrupulous broker had manipulated Charles' funds so as to ruin Katherine's father without his client's knowledge.

Cast
 Thomas Meighan as Charles Edward Martin
 Mildred Harris as Katherine Woods
 Charlotte Jackson as Comfort Brown
 Nigel Barrie as Jack Carruthers
 Guy Oliver as Bland
 Arthur Stuart Hull as J.J. Stratton
 Sylvia Ashton as Mrs. Prouty
 Fred Huntley as Mr. Cricket
 Peaches Jackson as Little Girl

References

External links

1921 films
American silent feature films
1920s English-language films
Silent American drama films
1921 drama films
Lost American films
Paramount Pictures films
Films directed by Tom Forman
American black-and-white films
1921 lost films
Lost drama films
1920s American films